Arcole was one of five second-rank, 90-gun, steam-powered  ships of the line built for the French Navy in the 1850s. The ship participated in the Second Italian War of Independence in 1859 and was scrapped in 1872.

Description
The Algésiras-class ships were repeats of the pioneering ship of the line  and were also designed by naval architect Henri Dupuy de Lôme. Their crew numbered 913 officers and ratings.

The primary difference between Napoléon and the Algésiras class was that the boilers of the latter ships were moved forward of the engines. Arcole was powered by a pair of four-cylinder horizontal-return connecting-rod steam engines that drove the single propeller shaft using steam provided by eight boilers. The ships were fitted with three masts and ship rigged.

The armament of the Algésiras-class ships consisted of eighteen 36-pounder smoothbore cannon and sixteen  Paixhans guns on the lower gundeck and thirty-four 30-pounder  cannon on the upper gundeck. On the quarterdeck and forecastle were twenty 30-pounder cannon and a pair of  rifled muzzle-loading guns.

Career 
Arcole took part in the Second Italian War of Independence, and was broken up in 1872.

Citations

References

Ships of the line of the French Navy
Algésiras-class ships of the line
1855 ships
Ships built in France
Napoléon-class ships of the line